Norman Kempton Atkins (June 27, 1934 – September 28, 2010) was a Canadian Senator and a political figure in Canada.

Born in Montclair, New Jersey, Atkins was a graduate of Appleby College in Oakville and of Acadia University in Wolfville, Nova Scotia, where he completed the Bachelor of Arts program in 1957. He subsequently received an Honorary Doctorate in Civil Law in 2000, from Acadia University.

Atkins was a leading figure in advertising and a senior Progressive Conservative Party of Ontario and Progressive Conservative Party of Canada strategist. He was especially associated with the Big Blue Machine, which helped elect the Ontario PC Party under Bill Davis. In the 1980s, he was a strategist for the federal Conservatives, led by Brian Mulroney, who recommended him to Governor General Jeanne Sauvé for appointment to the Senate in 1986.

Atkins opposed the merger of the Progressive Conservative Party with the Canadian Alliance, and refused to join the product of that merger, the Conservative Party of Canada. Instead, he continued to sit in the Senate as a "Progressive Conservative" along with Lowell Murray and Elaine McCoy. He did not initially rule out joining the new Conservative Party caucus in the future, saying in February 2004, "I will be watching with interest, both the Leadership and the policies of the new party, to see whether they address my concerns. It is my hope that they will reflect the values and beliefs Progressive Conservatives hold so strongly". However, he continued to sit as a Progressive Conservative for the duration of his time in the Senate.

On February 27, 2007, Atkins was elected vice-chairman of the Senate's National Security and Defence Committee. He was elected with the support of defiant Liberal senators after moderate Conservative Senator Michael Meighen resigned his position at the direction of the Prime Minister's Office who reportedly wished to install a more ideologically conservative co-chair.

Atkins retired from the Senate upon turning 75 on June 27, 2009. He died in Fredericton on September 28, 2010 at the age of 76.

Archives 
There is a Norman Atkins fonds at Library and Archives Canada. Archival reference number is R5376.

See also
 List of Ontario senators

References

External links

1934 births
2010 deaths
Canadian senators from Ontario
Progressive Conservative Party of Canada senators
American emigrants to Canada
People from Montclair, New Jersey
Acadia University alumni
Appleby College alumni
21st-century Canadian politicians